St. John is a city in and the county seat of Stafford County, Kansas, United States.  As of the 2020 census, the population of the city was 1,228.

History
The first settlement in what is today St. John was made in 1875 when William Bickerton of the Church of Jesus Christ founded a religious colony named Zion Valley.  By 1879, Zion Valley had grown into a small town, and the residents renamed it St. John, after then governor John P. St. John, in order to gain favor in winning the county seat of Stafford County.

In 2015, due to diligent work of local citizens and former local graduates, the official government listing of locations has been corrected to spell the town correctly as "St. John" instead of "Saint John" that was incorrectly changed by the United States Postal Service in the 1970s.

Geography
St. John is located at  (38.0022371, -98.7600887).

Demographics

2010 census
As of the census of 2010, there were 1,295 people, 534 households, and 336 families residing in the city. The racial makeup of the city was 92.4% White, 0.2% African American, 1.2% Native American, 0.8% Asian, 4.2% from other races, and 1.2% from two or more races. Hispanic or Latino of any race were 15.1% of the population.

There were 534 households, of which 30.3% had children under the age of 18 living with them, 51.5% were married couples living together, 7.9% had a female householder with no husband present, 3.6% had a male householder with no wife present, and 37.1% were non-families. 34.8% of all households were made up of individuals, and 18.2% had someone living alone who was 65 years of age or older. The average household size was 2.38 and the average family size was 3.09.

The median age in the city was 42.7 years. 25.9% of residents were under the age of 18; 7.4% were between the ages of 18 and 24; 20.5% were from 25 to 44; 26.2% were from 45 to 64; and 19.9% were 65 years of age or older. The gender makeup of the city was 49.4% male and 50.6% female.

2000 census
As of the census of 2000, there were 1,318 people, 569 households, and 337 families residing in the city. The racial makeup of the city was 96.36% White, 0.38% African American, 0.23% Asian, 2.12% from other races, and 0.91% from two or more races. Hispanic or Latino of any race were 3.57% of the population.

There were 569 households, out of which 28.5% had children under the age of 18 living with them, 50.8% were married couples living together, 5.6% had a female householder with no husband present, and 40.6% were non-families. 38.1% of all households were made up of individuals, and 18.3% had someone living alone who was 65 years of age or older. The average household size was 2.26 and the average family size was 3.01.

In the city, the population was spread out, with 26.3% under the age of 18, 5.0% from 18 to 24, 25.9% from 25 to 44, 21.2% from 45 to 64, and 21.6% who were 65 years of age or older. The median age was 40 years. For every 100 females, there were 88.3 males. For every 100 females age 18 and over, there were 85.1 males.

The median income for a household in the city was $31,050, and the median income for a family was $41,761. Males had a median income of $27,986 versus $23,152 for females. The per capita income for the city was $17,889. About 7.3% of families and 9.1% of the population were below the poverty line, including 8.7% of those under age 18 and 10.1% of those age 65 or over.

Education
St. John is home to St. John/Hudson High School.  The mascot is a Tiger.

References

Further reading

 Cole, Clelland, and Helen Malin Reuber. No Cyclone Shall Destroy: The Story of St. John, Kansas. Ardmore, Pa: Dorrance & Co., 1981.
 Gary R. Entz, "Zion Valley: The Mormon Origins of St. John, Kansas," Kansas History 24 (summer 2001), 98-117. (Download 1MB PDF eBook)
 Gary R. Entz, "The Bickertonites: Schism and Reunion in a Restoration Church, 1880-1905", Journal of Mormon History 32 (fall 2006): 1-44. (Download 4MB PDF eBook)

External links
 City of St. John
 St. John - Directory of Public Officials
 USD 350, local school district
 , from Hatteberg's People on KAKE TV news
 St. John city map, KDOT

Cities in Kansas
County seats in Kansas
Cities in Stafford County, Kansas
Populated places established in 1875
1875 establishments in Kansas